Lactarius deliciosus, commonly known as the saffron milk cap and red pine mushroom, is one of the best known members of the large milk-cap genus Lactarius in the order Russulales. It is native to Europe, but has been accidentally introduced to other countries along with pine trees, with which the fungus is symbiotic.

Taxonomy 
The species was known to Carl Linnaeus, who officially described it in the second volume of his Species Plantarum in 1753, giving it the name Agaricus deliciosus. The specific epithet is derived from Latin deliciosus, meaning "tasty". The Swedish taxonomist allegedly gave the species its epithet after smelling it and presuming it tasted good, perhaps confusing it with a Mediterranean milk cap regarded for its flavor. Dutch mycologist Christian Hendrik Persoon added the varietal epithet lactifluus in 1801, before English mycologist Samuel Frederick Gray placed it in its current genus, Lactarius, in 1821 in his The Natural Arrangement of British Plants.

It is commonly known as saffron milk-cap, red pine mushroom, or simply pine mushroom in English. An alternative North American name is orange latex milky. Its Spanish name varies (nícalo, ...). Both this and L. deterrimus are known as "kanlıca", "çıntar" or "çam melkisi" in Turkey. In Romania, it is known as Rascovi and it can be found in the northern regions in autumn season.

Description
The cap is sticky and viscid when wet, but is often dry. The flesh stains a deep green color when handled. When fresh, it exudes an orange-red latex that does not change color.

The mushroom is similar to L. rubrilacteus, which stains blue, exudes a red latex, and is also edible. It also resembles L. olympianus, which has white latex and tastes unpleasant.

Chemistry 

When grown in liquid culture, the mycelium of Lactarius deliciosus produces a mixture of fatty acids and various compounds such as chroman-4-one, anofinic acid, 3-hydroxyacetylindole, ergosterol, and cyclic dipeptides.

Distribution and habitat 
L. deliciosus grows under conifers on acidic soils and forms a mycorrhizal relationship with its host tree. It is native to the southern Pyrenees where it grows under Mediterranean pines, as well as throughout the Mediterranean basin in Portugal, Bulgaria, Spain, Greece, Italy, Cyprus, France and elsewhere. Both this fungus and L. deterrimus are collected and sold in the İzmir Province of southwestern Turkey, and the Antalya Province of the south coast. In the island of Cyprus, large numbers of L. deliciosus are found in the high altitude Pinus nigra and P. brutia forests of the Troodos mountain range, where locals hunt them with vigour, as this fungus is highly esteemed among the local delicacies.

After analysing DNA from collections around the world, mycologists Jorinde Nuytinck, Annemieke Verbeken, and Steve Miller have concluded that L. deliciosus is a distinct European species that differs genetically, morphologically, and ecologically from populations in North America or Central America. It has been reportedly introduced to Chile, Australia and New Zealand, where it grows in Pinus radiata plantations. In Australia, popular places for collecting this mushroom, especially among the Polish community, are around Macedon in Victoria, Mount Crawford in the Adelaide Hills and in the Oberon area in New South Wales, Australia, where they can grow to the size of a dinner plate, and in the pine forests of the Australian Capital Territory. Many people of Italian, Polish, Ukrainian and other eastern European ancestry in the states of Victoria and New South Wales, Australia travel to collect these mushrooms after autumn rainfall around Easter time.

Pine plantations and Siberian pine forests are favourable habitats for this species.

Uses

L. deliciosus is an edible mushroom, but may taste mild or bitter; its misleading epithet, deliciosus ('delicious'), may have been caused by Linnaeus mistaking it for another species. The mushrooms are collected in August to early October, where they are traditionally fried, salted or pickled. High consumption of the species may cause urine to discolor to orange or red. Some field guides hold L. sanguifluus in higher esteem.

It is widely collected in the Iberian Peninsula, and used in Spanish cuisine—being probably the most sought after wild mushroom in the country. One recipe recommends they should be lightly washed, fried whole cap down in olive oil with a small amount of garlic and served drenched in raw olive oil and parsley. The same recipe advises that butter should never be used when cooking this mushroom.

Further north and east it is a feature of Provençal cuisine. They are also collected in Poland, where they are traditionally served fried in butter, with cream, or marinated. In Cyprus, saffron milk caps are usually grilled on the charcoal and then dressed in olive oil and lemon or bitter orange, they are sautéed with onions, or sometimes stewed with onions, coriander and red wine. In Russian cuisine these mushrooms are traditionally preserved by salting.

In India, the fungus is one of the ten most widely consumed mushrooms by ethnic tribes of Meghalaya.

Culture
A fresco in the Roman town of Herculaneum appears to depict L. deliciosus and is one of the earliest pieces of art to illustrate a fungus.

See also
List of Lactarius species

References

Cited texts

External links

deliciosus
Fungi of Europe
Fungi of Chile
Edible fungi
Catalan cuisine
Fungi described in 1753
Taxa named by Carl Linnaeus